Gabriel Gerald Geay (born September 10, 1996) is a Tanzanian long-distance runner. Geay has competed at the professional level in distances 5K through to the half marathon.

Geay has won 7 notable road races including the Peachtree Road Race (2016) and the Bolder Boulder 10K (2017). As of July 2018, Geay has earned over US$33,000 in prize money.

In 2017, he competed in the senior men's race at the 2017 IAAF World Cross Country Championships held in Kampala, Uganda. He finished in 22nd place.

In 2019, he competed in the senior men's race at the 2019 IAAF World Cross Country Championships held in Aarhus, Denmark. He finished in 88th place.

In 2021 he placed 6th in a new Tanzanian national record of 2:04:55 at the Milano Marathon in Italy.  This performance qualified him for the 2020 Tokyo Olympic Games in the men's marathon.  He competed at the Olympics with compatriot Alphonce Felix Simbu in the men's marathon in August 2021.

In 2022 he was second in the Valencia Marathon in Spain in a new PB and National Record of 2:03:00

Career achievements

References

External links
 

Living people
1996 births
Tanzanian male long-distance runners
Athletes (track and field) at the 2020 Summer Olympics
Olympic athletes of Tanzania
Olympic male marathon runners
21st-century Tanzanian people